Mbaye Diagne (born 28 October 1991) is a Senegalese professional footballer who played as a striker for Fatih Karagümrük.

Club career

Early career
Born in Dakar, Senegal, Diagne spent his early career in Italy, beginning in 2013, Diagne joined A.C. Bra, where he went on to score 23 goals in 29 Serie D matches.

Juventus
Diagne was signed by manager Antonio Conte for Serie A champions Juventus in July 2013. On 13 September 2013, he was signed on loan by French club Ajaccio to gain further first team experience. Ajaccio were then managed by Italian manager Fabrizio Ravanelli (who was also a former teammate of Conte's). However, the loan didn't go as planned and Diagne failed to make a single first team appearance.

Lierse loan
Diagne was loaned out to Belgian club Lierse in January 2014, and made his debut on 31 January against Anderlecht, scoring in the 25th minute. He scored a hat-trick against Mons on 8 February in his next game for the club, ending with 2 goals in 1 games for the club.

Al Shabab loan
On 2 August 2014, Al Shabab Saudi Arabian King Cup 2014 winner announced signing Diagne on loan until June 2015. Diagne made his debut against Al Nassr FC on 7 August 2014 at Saudi Super Cup as substitute and played the last 17 minutes of the second half and 30 minutes of extra-time. He wasted his penalty shootout chance to achieve triumph over their rivals, but eventually his team won the cup.

Westerlo loan
On 5 January 2015, he joined KVC Westerlo on loan in the Belgium Pro League. He scored 1 goals in 2 games for the club.

Újpest loan
He joined Hungarian side Újpest FC on loan, he scored 2 goals in his first 3 games for the club, scoring in every single one of the games. On 24 October 2015 he created a much-publicized controversy, when 39-year old club legend Péter Kabát wanted to take a penalty which he earned, but Diagne tucked the ball under his shirt and eventually converted the kick himself. In fact neither Kabát nor Diagne but Balázs Balogh was the designated penalty taker.

Tianjin TEDA
After impressing on loan at Újpest, on 6 February 2016, Diagne transferred to Chinese Super League side Tianjin TEDA from Juventus on a permanent transfer, signing a two-year deal. He scored 9 goals in 17 league matches during his time at the club.

Kasımpaşa
On 17 January 2018, Diagne joined Turkish Süper Lig side Kasımpaşa from Tianjin TEDA. He made his debut for the club two days later, coming on as a substitute in the 85th minute, and scoring the winning goal in a 3–2 victory over Alanyaspor. On 12 May 2018, Diagne scored his first hat-trick for the club in a 3–1 win over Gençlerbirliği. During his first season in Istanbul, he played 17 games and scored 12 goals.

On 23 September 2018, with a goal in a 1–2 defeat to Alanyaspor, Diagne set the record of scoring 8 goals in his first 6 matches in the Süper Lig since the start of the season. He scored a brace in a 2–2 draw with Fenerbahçe. On 22 December, Diagne scored another two goals in a 4–1 win over Beşiktaş, but was suspended for one league game due to receiving his fourth yellow card. In the next fixture he received a red card in Turkish Cup against Alanyaspor due to spitting on his opponent and he was banned for an additional 4 matches, attracting interest from clubs like Leeds United.

Galatasaray
On 31 January 2019, Galatasaray announced the signing of Diagne for a transfer fee of €10 million, signing a contract until 31 August 2022. He made his debut for the club on 10 February 2019, in a match against Trabzonspor, scoring the opening goal from a penalty in a 3–1 win.

Diagne netted his first hattrick for the club in a 3–0 win against Yeni Malatyaspor. He later scored braces against Kayserispor and Çaykur Rizespor, thus keeping him in first place among top scorers in Süper Lig that season. On 15 May, he scored a late goal in a 3–1 win against Akhisarspor	in the Turkish Cup final, marking his first trophy with Galata. Diagne eventually finished the season as top scorer of the league, with a total of 30 goals, as Galatasaray won the domestic treble.

Club Brugge (loan) 
On 2 September 2019, Diagne joined Belgian First Division A side Club Brugge on loan.

He missed a penalty for the club in a Champions League match against PSG after ignoring instructions from manager Philippe Clement and was subsequently fined and suspended as a result.

West Bromwich Albion (loan) 
On 29 January 2021, Diagne joined West Bromwich Albion on loan until the end of the season. On April 2021, Diagne scored his second Premier League goal in a 5-2 win against Chelsea.

Return to Galatasaray
On 18 July 2022, Galatasaray announced that Diagne's contract was mutually terminated.

Fatih Karagümrük 
On 18 July 2022, it was announced that he signed contract with Fatih Karagümrük until 31 August 2022.

International career
In March 2018, Diagne revealed that he left Chinese side Tianjin TEDA for Kasımpaşa to further his chances of playing for Senegal national team and further his chances of impressing to gain a place in the 2018 FIFA World Cup squad. On 17 May 2018, Diagne missed out on the World Cup squad after being overlooked by manager Aliou Cissé.

On 9 September 2018, Diagne made his debut for Senegal in a 2–2 draw against Madagascar in a 2019 Africa Cup of Nations qualifier, coming on in the last minute as a substitute for Moussa Konaté.

Career statistics

Club

International

Honours
Al-Shabab
Saudi Super Cup: 2014

Galatasaray
Süper Lig: 2018–19
Turkish Cup: 2018–19
Turkish Super Cup: 2019

Club Brugge
Belgian First Division A: 2019–20

Senegal
Africa Cup of Nations runner-up: 2019

Individual
Gol Kralı: 2018–19

References

External links

1991 births
Living people
Footballers from Dakar
Association football forwards
Senegalese footballers
A.C. Bra players
Juventus F.C. players
Lierse S.K. players
K.V.C. Westerlo players
Al-Shabab FC (Riyadh) players
Újpest FC players
Tianjin Jinmen Tiger F.C. players
Kasımpaşa S.K. footballers
Galatasaray S.K. footballers
Belgian Pro League players
Saudi Professional League players
Chinese Super League players
Süper Lig players
Senegalese expatriate footballers
Senegalese expatriate sportspeople in Italy
Senegalese expatriate sportspeople in Belgium
Senegalese expatriate sportspeople in Saudi Arabia
Senegalese expatriate sportspeople in China
Senegalese expatriate sportspeople in Turkey
Expatriate footballers in Italy
Expatriate footballers in Belgium
Expatriate footballers in Saudi Arabia
Expatriate footballers in China
Expatriate footballers in Turkey
2019 Africa Cup of Nations players
Senegal international footballers
Premier League players
West Bromwich Albion F.C. players
Fatih Karagümrük S.K. footballers